Susan Eloise Hinton (born July 22, 1948) is an American writer best known for her young-adult novels (YA) set in Oklahoma, especially The Outsiders (1967), which she wrote during high school. Hinton is credited with introducing the YA genre.

In 1988, she received the inaugural Margaret Edwards Award from the American Library Association for her cumulative contribution in writing for teens.

Career 
While still in her teens, Hinton became a household name as the author of The Outsiders, her first and most popular novel, set in Oklahoma in the 1960s. She began writing it in 1965. The book was inspired by two rival gangs at her school, Will Rogers High School, the Greasers and the Socs, and her desire to empathize with the Greasers by writing from their point of view. She wrote the novel when she was 16 and it was published in 1967. Since then, the book has sold more than 14 million copies. In 2017, Viking Press stated the book sells over 500,000 copies a year.

Hinton's publisher suggested she use her initials instead of her feminine given names so that the very first male book reviewers would not dismiss the novel because its author was female. After the success of The Outsiders, Hinton chose to continue writing and publishing using her initials because she did not want to lose what she had made famous and to allow her to keep her private and public lives separate.

Personal life 
In interviews, Hinton has stated that she is a private person and an introvert who no longer does public appearances. However, she has revealed that she enjoys reading (Jane Austen, Mary Renault, and F. Scott Fitzgerald), taking classes at the local university, and horseback riding. Hinton also stated in an interview with Vulture.com that she enjoys writing fan fiction.

She resides in Tulsa, Oklahoma, with her husband David Inhofe, a software engineer, after meeting him in her freshman biology class at college.

Adaptations 
Film adaptations of The Outsiders (March 1983) and Rumble Fish (October 1983) were both directed by Francis Ford Coppola; Hinton cowrote the script for Rumble Fish with Coppola. Also adapted to film were Tex (July 1982), directed by Tim Hunter, and That Was Then... This Is Now (November 1985), directed by Christopher Cain. Hinton herself acted as a location scout, and she had cameo roles in three of the four films. She plays a nurse in Dallas's hospital room in The Outsiders. In Tex, she is the typing teacher. She also appears as a sex worker propositioning Rusty James in Rumble Fish. In 2009, Hinton portrayed the school principal in The Legend of Billy Fail.

Awards and honors 
Hinton received the inaugural 1988 Margaret A. Edwards Award from the American YA librarians, citing her first four YA novels, which had been published from 1967 to 1979 and adapted as films from 1982 to 1985. The annual award recognizes one author of books published in the U.S., and specified works "taken to heart by young adults over a period of years, providing an 'authentic voice that continues to illuminate their experiences and emotions, giving insight into their lives'." The librarians noted that in reading Hinton's novels "a young adult may explore the need for independence and simultaneously the need for loyalty and belonging, the need to care for others, and the need to be cared for by them."

In 1992, she was inducted into Phi Beta Kappa by the University of Tulsa, and in 1998 she was inducted into the Oklahoma Writers Hall of Fame at the Oklahoma Center for Poets and Writers of Oklahoma State University–Tulsa.

Works

Young adult novels 
The five YA novels, her first books published, are Hinton's works most widely held in WorldCat libraries. All are set in Oklahoma.
 The Outsiders (1967)
 That Was Then, This Is Now  (1971)
 Rumble Fish (1975)
 Tex (1979)
 Taming the Star Runner (1988)

Children's books 
 Big David, Little David, illustrated by Alan Daniel (1995), picture book 
 The Puppy Sister, illustrated by Jacqueline Rogers (1995), chapter book

Adult fiction 
 Hawkes Harbor (2004), novel
 Some of Tim's Stories (2007), short stories

Autobiography 
 Great Women Writers, Rita Dove, S.E. Hinton, and Maya Angelou (Princeton NJ: Hacienda Productions, 1999), DVD video — autobiographical accounts by the three authors

Notes

References

Further reading
 "Some of Hinton's Stories", interview for Vanity Fair (May 14, 2007)
 "Staying Golden" article in the New York Press (September 28, 2004)

External links 

 
 
 
 "Hinton, Susan Eloise" in the Encyclopedia of Oklahoma History and Culture
 S. E. Hinton at Library of Congress Authorities — with 17 catalog records

 

1948 births
Living people
20th-century American novelists
21st-century American novelists
American children's writers
American women novelists
American young adult novelists
Margaret A. Edwards Award winners
Writers from Tulsa, Oklahoma
University of Tulsa alumni
American women children's writers
20th-century American women writers
21st-century American women writers
Women writers of young adult literature
Novelists from Oklahoma